The second season of Big Brother Célébrités premiered on 9 January 2022 on Noovo. Singer Marie-Mai Bouchard returned to host. Following the success of the first season, Noovo announced plans for a second season in July 2021.

Changes this season included the house being moved from its original home, a mansion on Île-Bizard retrofitted for the show, to a custom-built home in a soundstage in the Montreal borough of Anjou. The house is 16,000 square feet large, fitted with 69 cameras and 61 one-way mirrors. In addition, the winner will no longer be decided by all previously evicted housemates, but a jury of a determined number of recently evicted ex-housemates, keeping in line with the format used in the United States and English-speaking Canada. Also new this season is a weekly aftershow: Big Brother : Les gérants d'estrade (English: Big Brother: Stage Managers). Airing on Noovo immediately following the live eviction, the aftershow features commentary on the week that was and the progress of the celebrity housemates thus far. It is hosted by Kim Rusk and Jean-Thomas Jobin, both winners of previous Big Brother series, respectively Loft Story season 3 and Big Brother Célébrités season 1.

Housemates
The housemate identities were fully revealed hours before the premiere of the show.  Hugo Barrette was initially named as a replacement for Stéphane Fallu -- the latter having tested positive for COVID-19 during the pre-show sequester and slated to no longer participate -- but host Marie-Mai announced on the premiere that Stéphane would enter the house one week later on Day 8 as the 17th housemate.

COVID-19 in the house
The ongoing COVID-19 pandemic, particularly the ongoing fifth wave caused by the highly transmissible Omicron variant has resulted in the disease being a major narrative of the season thus far. 

Before entering the house, the 16 original housemates were sequestered (commensurate with the general format of the Big Brother franchise to cut off participants from any communication with the outside world for a period of time before entering the house) and subject to several tests to detect for the virus that causes COVID-19. As a result of these tests, Stéphane Fallu tested positive and was immediately quarantined. Though it was initially reported that he would no longer take part -- his spot replaced by Hugo Barrette -- it was later announced he would enter the house as the 17th housemate; he entered the house on Day 8.

Shortly before Stéphane's entry into the house on Day 8, after exhibiting symptoms, Eddy King tested positive for COVID-19 and was immediately isolated from the rest of the house. However, he was still an active housemate, meaning he could still be nominated and evicted. On Day 11, Martin Vachon, Michelle Desrochers, Valérie Carpentier, Lysanne Richard, Stéphanie Harvey, & Tranna Wintour all tested positive for the virus and were all immediately isolated in the Head of the House room.

All affected housemates have since fully recovered and rejoined the main group.

The Condemned (Have-Nots)

Voting history

Notes
:  The first 16 housemates were divided into two groups to compete in the first Boss of the House competition of the season. Each group was further divided into pairs. The winning pairs would be immune for the week, and would then unanimously decide who amongst themselves would be the first Boss.
: During Weeks 2 and 3, Karl was selected to play in the Veto competition by Eddy and Stéphanie as their stand-in, as they were both ineligible to compete because they contracted COVID-19. He won both competitions but the official Veto winners were Eddy and Stéphanie. However, as he was not the official holder of the Veto, Karl was still eligible to be named the replacement nominee.
: Week 5 was Invisible Week, in which all power competitions were held privately, and the power holders remained anonymous. Claudia became the invisible Boss of The House and had to nominate in secret; her access to the luxury bedroom was prohibited. Martin won the invisible Veto and secretly used it on himself. Additionally, the result of the eviction vote was not revealed to the housemates. 
: This week was a double eviction week. Following the first eviction, the remaining housemates played a week's worth of games, including Boss of the House and Veto competitions, and Nomination, Veto and Eviction ceremonies, during the remainder of the live show, culminating in a second eviction for the week.
: Martin won the "Safety for an ally" power and used it on Claudia. After she was named Martin's replacement nominee, she was revealed as safe for the week.
: Because of the "Box of Trouble" twist, a third nominee was added to this week. This third nominee was chosen by a house vote between Claudia and Éléonore. The house chose Claudia. 
: With 3 nominees & Boss of House not being able to vote, only Stéphanie was able to cast a valid eviction vote.

References

Celebrity Big Brother seasons
2022 Canadian television seasons